The Ulm Sparrow (Ger. Ulmer Spatz) is a landmark in, and symbol of, the German city of Ulm.

According to legend, the inhabitants of Ulm needed a particularly large beam for the construction of Ulm Minster, but could not get it through the city gate. As they were about to tear the gate down, they noticed a sparrow carrying a straw for its nest; which turned it from crosswise to lengthwise in its beak. A realization descended on the people of Ulm. Since that epiphany, they have placed long loads along rather than across their carts and were able to enter the city without rebuilding their gate.

The legend is first recorded in an 1842 poem by Carl Hertzog.

This legend has given rise to the Ulm Sparrow Award. The award tends to be an image of the Ulmer Spatz, usually a figurine in metal, ceramic, plastic, or recyclable paper, with a title along the lines of "The Ulm Sparrow Award". It is awarded to a person who brings forward a seemingly important idea or concept, possibly seeking undeserved recognition, isn't at all important, is superfluous, or is rather obvious. It is generally awarded in jest, or not, but the message is clear: let's not waste effort on the trivial and non-contributing, let's focus on what truly matters.

The  Ulm Sparrow Award has entered our culture in a number of disciplines and gatherings including medicine, engineering, and law to mention a few. It is likely to enter the political arena quite soon.

The legend's origin 
The figure on the nave of Ulm Minster was donated by wealthy citizens. It is not a sparrow, but a dove carrying an olive branch in its beak, as in the biblical story of Noah's Ark. It is small in relation to the building, and only easily visible from the tower. Over time, the inhabitants came to refer to it mockingly as a sparrow, and the legend grew from there.

Cultural and other references 
 Ulmer Spatz is a nickname both for inhabitants of Ulm and for players in the sports club SSV Ulm 1846.
 Ulmer Spatz is a glazed bread roll, similar to a pretzel.
 A children's and youth's choir is named Die Ulmer Spatzen.
 A tramcar called Ulmer Spatz operates at weekends from Ulm through the Swabian Jura.
 A restored cruise ship on the Upper Danube is named Ulmer Spatz.
 Asteroid 8345 Ulmerspatz is named after the Ulm Sparrow.

References

Gallery 

Ulm